The Second Battle of Katwa occurred between the Bengal and Maratha Empire in December 1745. After the defeats of the Marathas in the first four invasions of Bengal (see Maratha invasions of Bengal), the Maratha General and ruler of Nagpur, Raghuji Bhonsle again invaded the territory of Bengal. Bhonsle, with 20,000 horsemen attacked the civilians of Murshidabad and moved onwards to Katwa. However he was repeatedly ambushed by peasant guerillas and militias in Birbhum and near Durgapur, and thus his column was thinned considerably. The Marathas met Alivardi Khan's army in Katwa where the battle started. During the battle, most of the Marathas were slaughtered and the remaining Maratha soldiers under Raghuji Bhonsle retreated from Katwa. The Marathas then retreated towards Medinipur. The battle was a victory for Alivardi Khan who had once again ousted the Marathas from East Bengal. After this battle, Alivardi Khan was known in Bengal as "Maratha-khuni" which translates to "Maratha-killer" in Bengali.

See also 
 Maratha invasions of Bengal
 First Battle of Katwa
 Battle of Burdwan

References

Katwa 1745
Katwa
1745 in India